Marmarabirlik is a Turkish olive production company. It was established on June 28, 1954 as a Union of Agricultural Sales Cooperative (UASC), cultivating, harvesting and marketing of olives with mutual assistance and cooperation of the region's olive farmers. The founder members of Marmarabirlik were respectively Gemlik, Mudanya and Erdek Olive Agriculture Sales Cooperatives. Subsequently, Orhangazi, İznik, Edincik, Mürefte, and Marmara Island Olive Agriculture Sales Cooperatives joined the union. Currently, the operating area has extended from İznik Lake to the South Coast of Marmara Sea and Mürefte; a total of eight member cooperatives have evolved into a union. The general manager of Marmara Birlik is İsmail Acar and the chairman of the board of directors is Hidamet Asa.
 

It is the largest olive producer in Turkey by its purchasing, processing and sales capacity. The company has an average capacity of 30,000 tons of olive purchasing, processing, and sales each year. Marmarabirlik has ranked as the 345th company with its annual turnover among the list of largest 500 industrial establishment in Turkey, organized by Istanbul Chamber of Industry. It also has ranked 41st largest company in the province of Bursa, organized by Bursa Chamber of Industry. In addition, Marmarabirlik has 28,500 members consisted from olive farmers.

The company provides new technologies, inputs, and cash credits to olive farmers. In April 2011, Marmarabirlik signed a protocol with Ziraat Bank in order to provide agricultural credits for its members.

Sales and marketing activities 

Marmarabirlik is also known under the slogan The Name of Olive, that meets the domestics and foreign consumers' needs of black and green table olives, olive oil, and olive paste with averagely 30,000 tons of fresh olive per year, which have received from partners' of members. Marmarabirlik conducts sales and marketing activities of produced its products to whole of Turkey with 58 dealers in 78 provinces, to Germany, Denmark, Switzerland, Russia, Northern Cyprus, Bulgaria and to whole Europe with contracted buyer companies and furthermore to Canada, United States and Australia markets.

Marmarabirlik does not only communicate with its consumers through the dealers, but it also communicates via online trading. Two websites were established on the internet for the purpose of corporate operations and e-commerce. The first of these, marmarabirlik.com.tr is an official website of the union which leads to digital communications with consumers, suppliers, dealers, and members. This website is published in Turkish and English Languages and has been operating since 1997. The other web site is e-marmarabirlik.com which was launched in 2008 to reach consumers online. It has also published through Facebook since May 2011.

Marmarabirlik sold its table olives in 205 different packaging, which are produced by natural fermentation which means untreated olives are placed directly in brine with slight surface depression and without addition of a preservative, is sold depends on size grading with 8 different names (MGA 201 – 230), (HPR 231 – 260), (SPR 261 – 290), (HSS 291 – 320), (EXT 321 – 350), (ELT 351 – 380), (LKS 381 – 410), and (MNY 411 – 460)that means the olives are size-graded by count of the number of fruits per kilogramme or hectogramme. The company sells its products under the name of Marmarabirlik, Marbir, and Unimar trade brand. The weight of packs are 125 gr, 200 gr, 250 gr, 400 gr, 480 gr, 500 gr, 800 gr, 1 kg, 2 kg, 5 kg, and 10 kg in which are made by cans, vacuum, glass, and plastics. Pasteurizations and sterilizations procedures are applied to all of the packaged olives and no preservations are used by the union. In addition, Extra Virgin Olive Oil and Riviera Olive Oil are placed on the market with 14 different packs, in wholly hygienic and a modern place. Spicy and plain olive pastes are, also, available in 175 gr. and 340 gr. jar packs and 3 kg can pack as well. Marmarabirlik sells packaged the entire production and, a total of approximately 225 different packages are used for products of green and black table olives, olive oil, and olive paste.

History 

Marmarabirlik was established with joint of Gemlik, Mudanya, and Erdek Olive Agricultural Sales Cooperatives. A year after establishment of Marmarabirlik, Orhangazi Olive Agriculture Sale Cooperative joined the union. Then, in the 1970s and 1980s, Marmarabirlik received other olive agriculture sale cooperatives as a member of the union in the region, in order to increase production capacity. These cooperatives respectively joined the union, İznik in 1970, Edincik in 1976, Mürefte in 1986 and finally Marmara in 1988, and now, the numbers of its members are eight cooperatives.

For today, Marmarabirlik has been established on a total area of 403,000 square meters with a building area 136,000 square meters and an olive storage capacity of 70,400 tons. The union also has an olive packing capacity of approximately 150 tons/day and olive oil production and filling capacity of approximately 220 tons/day in Bursa. In a total, over 600 workers are to be employed throughout the union to be able to manage and use this capacity.

Licensed storage 
In 2004, the development project of Licensed Storage at Unions had been started by initiations of Turkish Ministry of Industry and Commerce and joints of The World Bank, and so, 5300 numbered legal provisions Licensed Storage of Agricultural Products enacted in 2005. Thus, unions aimed to be integrated system of licensed storage which have an important place in the storage of agricultural products and trade.

The total cost of the project was proposed between 70 or 80 million dollars and approximately 35 million dollars were provided in the scope of ARIP loan agreement by The World Bank. The basic principle of licensed storage is to fulfil on time both domestic and international markets' demand of agricultural products, where providing storage on their classified quality, on hygienic conditions with fair price, is to balance the markets.

Licensed storage activities of Marmarabirlik 
Today at this point, the project is successfully implemented only by Marmarabirlik in Turkey. In the scope of the project, Marmarabirlik had invested a total of 17,050,000 $ and the amount of 50% of the investment (8,525,000 $) was refunded from The World Bank's sources within the framework of the Protocol.

This project was started at the end of 2007 and completed at the end of 2008. During this period, construction of Başköy Licensed Olive Storage with a capacity of 7,000 tons, construction of Erdek Licensed Olive Storage with a capacity of 8,000 tons and construction of Başköy Licensed Olive Oil Storage with a capacity of 5,800 litres were completed by the union. In this project, glass reinforced plastic (GRP) tanks, due to more healthy and hygienic, used for preservation and natural fermentation of olives instead of concrete tanks and stainless steel tanks used for olive oil storage as well.

If the necessary of commercial and administrative infrastructure complete before olive harvest period of 2012, joint share licensed olive and olive oil storage company, has 23,000,000 TL (15,000,000) capital sum, will start to serve Turkish olive farmers and traders.

References

External links
 Corporate Web Site

Food and drink companies established in 1954
Turkish brands
Online retailers of Turkey
1954 establishments in Turkey